The 2012–13 Real Phoenix season was the first and only season of the Real Phoenix professional indoor soccer club. Real Phoenix, a Southwestern Division team in the Professional Arena Soccer League, played their first six home games in the Barney Family Sports Complex in the greater Phoenix suburb of Queen Creek, Arizona. The team played the final two home games of the season at the Arizona Sports Complex in Glendale, Arizona. The team was led by general manager Rosario Lopez Jr., head coach Kevin Grub, and assistant coach Rodolfo Hernandez.

Season summary
Real Phoenix struggled in the regular season, ultimately earning a 4–12 record and last place in the PASL's four-team Southwestern Division, and failed to advance to the postseason. The team also struggled at the box office, placing 18th in the 19-team league for average home attendance.

In late January 2013, the team informed the PASL that they were financially unable to complete their road schedule and the league revoked their franchise. The league sent a replacement squad coached by Kevin Leonard and filled out largely by members of his Texas Xtreme Premier Arena Soccer League team to cover Phoenix's road dates in south Texas. The team's final two home games were played with a squad of regular Real Phoenix players but with Kevin Leonard remaining as head coach.

The team participated in the 2012–13 United States Open Cup for Arena Soccer. They lost to the Las Vegas Legends in the Wild Card round, abruptly ending their run in the tournament.

Schedule

Pre-season

Regular season

† Game also counts for US Open Cup, as listed in chart below.
§ Team relocated to Arizona Sports Complex for final two home games.
♥ Replacement squad after franchise revoked by league.

2012–13 US Open Cup for Arena Soccer

References

External links
 eteamz.com/realphoenixfc Real Phoenix official website

Real Phoenix
Sports in Phoenix, Arizona
Real Phoenix
Real Phoenix